Ammonium cerium(IV) sulfate is an inorganic compound with the formula (NH4)4Ce(SO4)4·2H2O. It is an orange-colored solid.  It is a strong oxidant, the potential for reduction is  about +1.44V. Cerium(IV) sulfate is a related compound.

Structure
A crystallographic study shows that the compound contains the Ce2(SO4)88− anion, where the cerium atoms are 9 coordinated by oxygen atoms belonging to sulfate groups, in a distorted tricapped trigonal prism. The compound is thus sometimes formulated as (NH4)8[Ce2(SO4)8]·4H2O.

References

Cerium(IV) compounds
Sulfates
Ammonium compounds
Oxidizing agents